Dark Times may refer to:

 Star Wars: Dark Times, a 2006 comic book mini-series published by Dark Horse Comics
 "Dark Times", a song by Shihad from Love Is the New Hate, 2005
 "Dark Times", a song on The Weeknd's album Beauty Behind the Madness, 2015